Vittoria Accoramboni (15 February 155722 December 1585) was an Italian noblewoman. Her life became the basis for John Webster's play The White Devil, several novels, and a novella by Stendhal.

Biography
She was born in Gubbio in Umbria, the tenth child in a family belonging to the minor nobility of Gubbio, who migrated to Rome with a view to bettering their fortunes. After refusing several offers of marriage for Vittoria, her father betrothed her to Francesco Peretti, a man of no position, but a nephew of Cardinal Montalto, who was regarded as likely to become pope.

Vittoria was admired and worshipped by the cleverest and most brilliant men in Rome, and being luxurious and extravagant although poor, she and her husband were soon plunged in debt. Among her most fervent admirers was Paolo Giordano I Orsini, Duke of Bracciano, one of the most powerful men in Rome. Her brother Marcello, wishing to see her the duke's wife, had Peretti murdered (1581). The duke himself was suspected of complicity, inasmuch as he was believed to have murdered his first wife, Isabella de' Medici. Now that Vittoria was free he made her an offer of marriage, which she willingly accepted, and they were married shortly after.

But her good fortune aroused much jealousy, and attempts were made to annul the marriage; she was imprisoned in the Castel Sant'Angelo and only liberated through the intervention of Cardinal Carlo Borromeo. On the death of Pope Gregory XIII, Cardinal Montalto, her first husband's uncle, was elected in his place as Pope Sixtus V (1585); he vowed vengeance on the duke of Bracciano and Vittoria, who, warned in time, fled first to Venice and thence to Salò in Venetian territory. Here the duke died in November 1585, bequeathing to his widow all his personal property. The duchy of Bracciano passed to his son by his first wife.

Vittoria, overwhelmed with grief, went to live in retirement at Padua, where she was followed by Lodovico Orsini, a relation of her late husband and a servant of the Venetian republic, to arrange amicably for the division of the property. But a quarrel having arisen in this connection, Lodovico hired a band of bravi and had Vittoria assassinated at the end of 1585. He himself and nearly all his accomplices were afterwards put to death by order of the republic.

References in literature
Her story formed the basis of John Webster's drama tragedy, The White Devil, or The Tragedy of Paolo Giordano Ursini, Duke of Brachiano (1612), of Stendhal's novella Vittoria Accoramboni (1837–1839), of Ludwig Tieck's novel, Vittoria Accoramboni (1840) and of Robert Merle's novel l'Idole (1987) published in English translation as Vittoria.

References

  Endnote: Her story formed the basis of Webster's drama, The Tragedy of Paolo Giordano Ursini (1612), and of Ludwig Tieck's novel, Vittoria Accoramboni (1840); it is told more accurately in D. Gnoli's volume, Vittoria Accoramboni (Florence, 1870), and an excellent sketch of her life is given in Countess E. Martinengo-Cesaresco's Lombard Studies (London, 1902).

Further reading
 Clifford Bax, The Life of the White Devil, a full illustrated modern biography of Vittoria Accoramboni (Cassell, London, 1940)
 
 

1557 births
1585 deaths
Female murder victims
Italian murder victims
Italian untitled nobility
People from Gubbio